James Allen Juriga (born September 12, 1964) is a former guard who played three seasons in the National Football League (NFL). He started in Super Bowl XXIV for the Denver Broncos.

After he finished his football career, he obtained his doctor of veterinary medicine degree from Colorado State University. He lives with his wife Denise in Geneva, Illinois. His son Luke played college football for Western Michigan.

References

1964 births
Living people
American football offensive linemen
Colorado State University alumni
Denver Broncos players
Illinois Fighting Illini football players
Sportspeople from Wheaton, Illinois